First Methodist Church or variations with Building may refer to:

in the United States
(by state, then city/town)
 First Methodist Church (Lewisville, Arkansas), listed on the National Register of Historic Places (NRHP) in Lafayette County, Arkansas
 First Methodist Church of Oviedo, listed on the NRHP in Seminole County, Florida
 First Methodist Church of St. Petersburg, listed on the NRHP in Pinellas County, Florida
 First Methodist Church (Moscow, Idaho), listed on the NRHP in Latah County, Idaho
 First Methodist Church of Batavia, listed on the NRHP in Kane County, Illinois
 First Methodist Church (Aurora, Indiana), listed on the NRHP in Dearborn County, Indiana
 First Methodist Church (Rock Rapids, Iowa), listed on the NRHP in Lyon County, Iowa
 First United Methodist Church (Paintsville, Kentucky), listed on the NRHP as "First Methodist Church" in Johnson County, Kentucky
 First Methodist Church (Alexandria, Louisiana), listed on the NRHP in Rapides Parish, Louisiana
 First Methodist Church (Clinton, Massachusetts), listed on the NRHP in Worcester County, Massachusetts
 First Methodist Church (Brookhaven, Mississippi), listed on the NRHP in Lincoln County, Mississippi
 First Methodist Church of Greenwood, listed on the NRHP in Leflore County, Mississippi
 First Methodist Church (Tupelo, Mississippi), listed on the NRHP in Lee County, Mississippi
 First Methodist Church (Excelsior Springs, Missouri), listed on the NRHP in Clay County, Missouri
 First Methodist Church of Clovis, listed on the NRHP in Curry County, New Mexico
 First Methodist Church (Cleveland, Ohio), listed on the NRHP in Cuyahoga County, Ohio
First Methodist Church Building (Atoka, Oklahoma), listed on the NRHP in Atoka County, Oklahoma
 First Methodist Church, Gatlinburg, listed on the NRHP in Sevier County, Tennessee
 First Methodist Church (McMinnville, Tennessee), listed on the NRHP in Warren County, Tennessee
 First Methodist Church (Crockett, Texas), listed on the NRHP in Houston County, Texas
 First Methodist Church (Cuero, Texas), listed on the NRHP in DeWitt County, Texas
 First Methodist Church (Georgetown, Texas), listed on the NRHP in Williamson County, Texas
 First Methodist Church (Marshall, Texas), listed on the NRHP in Harrison County, Texas
 First Methodist Church of Rockwall, listed on the NRHP in Rockwall County, Texas
 First Methodist Church of Burlington, listed on the NRHP in Chittenden County, Vermont
 First Methodist Church (Monroe, Wisconsin), listed on the NRHP in Green County, Wisconsin
 First Methodist Church (Oshkosh, Wisconsin), listed on the NRHP in Winnebago County, Wisconsin
 First Methodist Church (Rhinelander, Wisconsin)
 First Methodist Church (Waukesha, Wisconsin), listed on the NRHP in Waukesha County, Wisconsin

See also

 
 
 List of Methodist churches
 First United Methodist Church (disambiguation)
 Methodism (disambiguation)
 The Methodist Church (disambiguation)